Bahr Halvorsen's Second Cabinet governed Norway between 6 March 1923 and 30 May 1923. It ceased to exist after the death of Prime Minister Otto Bahr Halvorsen. It had the following composition:

Cabinet members

|}

State Secretary
Not to be confused with the modern title State Secretary. The old title State Secretary, used between 1814 and 1925, is now known as Secretary to the Government (Regjeringsråd).

References

Otto B. Halvorsen's Second Government. 6 March 1923 - 30 May 1923 - Government.no

Notes

Bahr Halvorsen 2
Bahr Halvorsen 2
Bahr Halvorsen 2
1923 establishments in Norway
1923 disestablishments in Norway
Cabinets established in 1923
Cabinets disestablished in 1923